Richard Johnson is an American politician and city manager who served as Mayor of Taunton, Massachusetts and City Manager of Lowell, Massachusetts.

Early career
Prior to running for office, Johnson served as an administrative assistant to Taunton Mayor Theodore J. Aleixo, Jr. and as Director of the Taunton Housing Authority.

Mayor of Taunton
In 1981, incumbent Mayor Joseph Amaral chose not to seek re-election and Johnson ran to succeed him. He finished first in the preliminary election with 4289 votes, defeating Amaral's administrative assistant Walter Precourt Jr. (2776 votes), City Councilman Tijuana Goldstein-Star (2729 votes), recent Syracuse University graduate David Goren (262 votes), and rock musician Russell N. Hurst (76 votes). He defeated Precourt in the general election 7266 votes to 6030.

During Johnson's first term, the city suffered economic misfortune as Parker Brothers and Paragon Gear shut down their Taunton plants.
Although the city suffered through an economic slump and high unemployment during Johnson's early years as mayor, by 1987 unemployment in Taunton was at the lowest point on record. In 1986, GTE chose Taunton as the location for its new plant. In 1989, The Pyramid Companies announced plans to build a mall in Taunton, which would become the Silver City Galleria.

In 1990, Johnson prevented hip hop group 2 Live Crew from performing in Taunton, stating that he wanted to protect his community from the potential for violence and from the band's "outward display of immorality".

In 1991, Johnson was defeated in his bid for a sixth term, losing to Robert Nunes 6922 votes to 6741.

City Manager of Lowell
Shortly after his defeat, Johnson was chosen by the Lowell City Council to serve as City Manager. In 1992, Lowell lost control of its budget to the state finance commission due to its unstable financial condition. It regained control in 1995. That same year, the City Council  approved bond sales for the Tsongas Center and Edward A. LeLacheur Park.

Post-government career
After leaving government, Johnson served as vice president of Veolia Water North America.

See also
 Timeline of Lowell, Massachusetts, 1990s

References

City managers of Lowell, Massachusetts
Mayors of Taunton, Massachusetts
Year of birth missing (living people)
Living people